{{Infobox language
|name          = Pattae'
|nativename    = ''Basa Pattae|altname = Binuang, Southern Mamasa
|states        = Indonesia
|region        = Sulawesi
|speakers      = 
|date          = 
|ref=
|familycolor   = Austronesian
|fam2          = Malayo-Polynesian
|fam3          = South Sulawesi
|fam4 = Northern
|fam5 = Toraja
|fam6 = Mamasa
|iso3          =
|glotto=patt1250
|glottorefname=Pattae'
}}Pattae'''' (self-designation  or ) is the language spoken by the Pattae' people, an ethnic group living along the coast in the eastern part of Polewali Mandar Regency, West Sulawesi, Indonesia. Based on lexical similarity and mutual intelligibility, Pattae' has been classified as a dialect of the Mamasa language, but native speakers consider it a separate language.

References

External links 
 Pattae

Tribes
Indonesian-language culture